This article provides details of international football games played by the Lithuania national football team from 2020 to present.

Results

2020

2021

2022

Forthcoming fixtures
The following matches are scheduled:

Notes

References

Football in Lithuania
Lithuania national football team
2020s in Lithuanian sport